Avvai Natarajan (24 April 1936 – 21 November 2022) was an Indian Tamil scholar and educationist who was Vice-Chancellor of Thanjavur Tamil University. The Government of India honored Natarajan in 2011, with the fourth highest civilian award of Padma Shri.

Biography
Avvai Natarajan, hailing from the South Indian state of Tamil Nadu, was a secretary to the Government of Tamil Nadu in the Department of Tamil Language Development and Culture. Holder of an MLitt and a doctoral degree (PhD) in Tamil literature, Natarajan has also worked as the Vice Chancellor of Tamil University, Thanjavur. He was a member of the Central Institute of Classical Tamil, an institute established by the Government of India for propagation of classical Tamil language and culture. He also sat in the advisory councils of Sattakadir and the Madras Development Society. He has delivered keynote addresses in many seminars and held the chair of the selection committee of the Aram Award. In 2011, the Government of India honoured him with the civilian award of Padma Shri, honoring his contributions towards Tamil language and culture.

Death 
Natarajan died in Chennai, Tamil Nadu on 21 November 2022, at the age of 86.

References

External links

 
 

1936 births
2022 deaths
20th-century Indian educational theorists
Heads of universities and colleges in India
People from Thanjavur
Recipients of the Padma Shri in literature & education
Scholars from Tamil Nadu